Williamsburg is an unincorporated community in Clinch County, in the U.S. state of Georgia.

History
It is unknown why the name "Williamsburg" was applied to this place.

References

Unincorporated communities in Georgia (U.S. state)
Unincorporated communities in Clinch County, Georgia